Iulius Mall Cluj is a shopping mall in Cluj-Napoca, Romania, and was opened on 10 November 2007.

It has 250 stores including one hypermarket Auchan and several anchors, such as : Auchan, Inditex Group (Zara, Bershka, Pull & Bear, Stradivarius, Massimo Dutti), Tommy Hilfiger, H&M, Cinema City.
It has a 10 screen cinema complex, 25 fast-food and three restaurants.
It has a  swimming pool and a fitness club.
There are 2,180 parking spaces.

It also has a  exterior park with a lake view, called Iulius Park.

See also
Palas Iași
Iulius Mall Iaşi
Iulius Mall Suceava
Iulius Town Timișoara

References

External links

Iulius Mall Cluj Official Site
1 an de Iulius Mall Cluj - Foto
Site-ul restaurantului japonez Wasabi din Iulius Mall Cluj-Napoca

Shopping malls in Cluj-Napoca